Saint Ann is the largest parish in Jamaica. It is situated on the north coast of the island, in the county of Middlesex, roughly halfway between the eastern and western ends of the island. It is often called "the Garden Parish of Jamaica" on account of its natural floral beauty. Its capital is Saint Ann's Bay. Saint Ann comprises New Seville, the first Spanish settlement in Jamaica.

Saint Ann is the birthplace of reggae singers Floyd Lloyd, Burning Spear, Busy Signal, Bryan Art, Romain Virgo, Rashawn Dally, Chezidek, Shabba Ranks, Justin Hinds, Perfect, and Bob Marley. Marcus Mosiah Garvey, one of the seven recipients of Jamaica's Order of National Hero, was also born there.

History

Saint Ann is one of the oldest populated areas in the island of Jamaica tracing back to 600–650 A.D. It is believed to be the earliest Taino/Arawak settlement in Jamaica. When Christopher Columbus first came to Jamaica in 1494, he landed on the shores of Saint Ann at Discovery Bay, Jamaica. He returned to Jamaica on his fourth voyage and was eventually marooned for one year at Saint Ann's Bay (June 1503 – June 1504), which he called Santa Gloria. The first Spanish settlement in Jamaica was also at Sevilla la Nueva, now called Seville, just to the west of Saint Ann's Bay. Established by Juan de Esquivel, the first Spanish Governor of Jamaica, Saint Ann's Bay became the third capital established by Spain in the Americas. The first sugar mills were established by the Spaniards in Sevilla la Nueva before 1526.

After 1655, when the English captured Jamaica, Saint Ann's Bay gradually developed as a fishing port with many warehouses and wharves. The parish of Saint Ann was later named after Lady Anne Hyde the first wife of King James II of England. Ocho Rios began to develop as a modern town and a favourite tourist destination in Jamaica. Its development commenced when Reynolds Jamaica Mines built a deep-water pier, west of the town to ship bauxite ore from the mines.

In the 1960s the Saint Ann Development Council began the systematic development of Ocho Rios creating a modern town.

Geography
The parish is located at latitude 18°12'N, longitude 77°28'W. It is bordered by Clarendon and Saint Catherine in the south, Saint Mary in the east, and Trelawny in the west. As with all but one parish, its coast is washed by the Caribbean Sea. Saint Ann covers an area of 1,212.6 km2, making it the largest parish, before Saint Elizabeth's 1,212.4 km2. The population was an estimated at 173,232 in 2012. Besides Saint Ann's Bay, other important towns located in Saint Ann are Discovery Bay, Brown's Town, and Ocho Rios.

The highest elevation in the parish is in the Dry Harbour Mountains at 762 metres above sea level. Because of its limestone formation, the parish is noted for its 59 caves and numerous sinkholes. The Moneague Lake, which varies considerably in size, is one of the few large intermittent lakes in the island. The boundary between Saint Ann and Saint Mary is formed by the White River, which flows for 27.4 kilometres. Other rivers like the Dunn's River appear intermittently, rising a few kilometres from the coast. The names of the main rivers are Negro, Saint Ann, Great, Roaring, Cave and Pedro (see List of rivers of Jamaica).

Economy

Agriculture

The agricultural products are mainly bananas, allspice/pimento, sugar, coconuts, coffee, limes, corn, ginger, sweet potatoes, sensimilia yam, and annatto. The soil is also suitable for citrus and, sisal is cultivated in the drier areas. The parish is also noted for cattle rearing, horses and hogs (swine). Recently, however, agriculture has been on the decline as farmland is being used for housing and other developments and the cultivated area has decreased.

Tourism

The major economic activity in the parish is tourism. Saint Ann is one of the major tourist destinations of Jamaica, given that Dunn's River Falls and many popular beaches, like Puerto Seco Beach, are located there. There is a cruise ship dock (maritime) on the west shore of Ocho Rios Bay, and numerous hotels and resorts (including a Sandals Resort) are located in and around the city. It is also the birthplace/resting place for Bob Marley (6 February 1945 – 11 May 1981).

Commerce
Banks and supermarkets along with some restaurants make up the rest of the economy. The farmers market where small farmers and food vendors operate is also a source of employment for the locals.

Education

High schools

Ferncourt High School
York Castle High School
St. Hilda's High School
Ocho Rios High School
Marcus Garvey Technical High School
Brown's Town High School
Aabuthnott Gallimore High School
Saint Ann's Bay High School (Private)
Prospect College (private semi-military)
The NorthGate High School(Private)
Steer Town Academy
Mount Pleasant Academy (Private)

Community Colleges
Brown's Town Community College
Moneague College

Correctional centres

The Hill Top Juvenile Correctional Centre, operated by the Department of Correctional Services, Jamaica, is located in Bamboo and has a capacity for 98.

The Armadale Juvenile Correctional Centre for girls was located in Alexandria but on 22 May 2009 a fire went through the facility, killing 5 girls and injuring 13 more. The replacement facility is located in Diamond Crest Villa near Alligator Pond in Manchester Parish.

The Parish also contains the historic Saint Ann's Bay Old Jail, perhaps the first prison in Jamaica.

Politics 
Saint Ann Parish is represented in the Parliament of Jamaica by four single-member constituencies:

 Saint Ann North Eastern
 Saint Ann North Western
 Saint Ann South Eastern
 Saint Ann South Western

Attractions

Natural
Dunn's River Falls
Green Grotto Caves
Ocho Rios Marine Park
Fern Gully
Shaw Park Gardens
Coyaba River Garden
Puerto Seco Beach
Chukka Cove Adventures
White River Rafting
Dolphin Cove 
Bob Marley Mausoleum
Cranbrook Flower Forrest
Seville heritage park
Mystic Mountain

Historic
Seville Heritage Park
Bob Marley Mausoleum, Nine Mile
Columbus Park
Marcus Garvey Statue, Saint Ann's Bay
Edinburgh Castle (ruins)
Roaring River

See also

Bob Marley
Marcus Garvey
Burning Spear
D.K. Duncan
Peter Cargill
Floyd Lloyd
Jamaica national bobsled team
Bass Odyssey
Romain Virgo

Notes

References

External links
Statistics
Statistical Institute of Jamaica
JCO descent into Hutchinson's Hole - Feb, 2004
Jamaica Heritage Trust

 
Parishes of Jamaica
Anne Hyde